Metasia kurdistanalis is a moth in the family Crambidae. It was described by Hans Georg Amsel in 1961 and is found in Iraq.

References

Moths described in 1961
Metasia